Ariniș is a commune in Maramureș County, Crișana, Romania. It is composed of three villages: Ariniș, Rodina (Rogyina), and Tămășești (Szilágyegerbegy).

History
The village of Ariniș has been documentary certified since 1543 under the name of "Egherhat". Ariniș was archaeologically documented in the Middle Ages, named "Sub ogrăzi"; Bronze Age, Suciu de Sus culture.

Economy
Inside the village there is a fish farm. The industrial part is represented by  a manufacturer of rubber products. Residents are working at several stores and warehouses of materials, too.

Sights
 Orthodox Church in Ariniș, built in the 20th century

Natives
 Ioan Dragomir (1905—1985), Romanian bishop of the Greek-Catholic Church

References

Communes in Maramureș County
Localities in Crișana